Saint-Léon-sur-l'Isle (literally Saint Léon on the Isle; Limousin: Sent Leu d’Eila) is a commune in the Dordogne department in Nouvelle-Aquitaine in southwestern France. Saint-Léon-sur-l'Isle station has rail connections to Bordeaux, Périgueux, Brive-la-Gaillarde and Limoges.

Population

See also
Communes of the Dordogne department

References

Communes of Dordogne